The 2006 Bank of the West Classic was a women's tennis tournament played on outdoor hard courts. It was part of the Tier II Series of the 2006 WTA Tour. It took place at the Taube Tennis Center in Stanford, California, United States, from July 24 through July 30, 2006.

Finals

Singles

 Kim Clijsters defeated  Patty Schnyder, 6–4, 6–2
It was Clijsters's 2nd title of the year, and her 32nd overall.

Doubles

 Anna-Lena Grönefeld /  Shahar Pe'er defeated  Maria Elena Camerin /  Gisela Dulko, 6–1, 6–4

External links
 ITF tournament edition details

Bank of the West Classic
Silicon Valley Classic
Bank of the West Classic
Bank of the West Classic
Bank of the West Classic